Alvera Mukabaramba, is a pediatrician and politician in Rwanda, who has been the Minister of State for Local Government Responsible for Social Affairs in the Cabinet of Rwanda, since 10 October 2011.

Background and education
She was born in Rwanda on 1 March 1960. She studied at the First Pavlov State Medical University, in St.Petersburg, Russia, graduating with a medical degree. She specialized in pediatrics, and the university awarded her a Doctor of Philosophy in the subject.

Career
Alvera Mukabaramba's political career began in 1999, when she became a member of the National Transitional Assembly, serving in that capacity until 2003. From 2003 until October 2011, she was a Senator in Rwanda's bicameral parliament. Then on 10 October 211, she was appointed State Minister for Social Affairs and Community Development in the Ministry of Local Government, replacing the late Christine Nyatanyi, who died in a hospital in Brussels, Belgium. Since then, she has been retained in the cabinet and has retained her portfolio in the various cabinet reshuffles, including the one on 31 August 2017.

Other considerations
Makaramba is a member of the Party of Progress and Concord (PPC). She has twice ran for the presidency of Rwanda. The first time was in 2003, but she withdrew and threw her weight behind Paul Kagame. She ran again in 2010, but lost.

In 2012, she was elected as the new president of the "Rwanda Forum for Political Parties" (FFFP), an organization that brings together all the political parties in the country, to foster national unity.

See also
Parliament of Rwanda
Government of Rwanda

References

External links
Website of the Rwanda Ministry of Local Government (Minaloc)

Living people
1960 births
Rwandan pediatricians
Government ministers of Rwanda
Social affairs ministers of Rwanda
Women government ministers of Rwanda
21st-century Rwandan politicians
21st-century Rwandan women politicians